"Gamble Everything for Love" is a pop song and also an EP by the Australian singer Ben Lee. It was released on 13 December 2004 by Ten Fingers. The song peaked at #39 on the ARIA Singles Chart in January 2005, spending 8 weeks in the top 50. The song was used in the popular series The Blacklist, in series 3 episode : The Director

It was ranked #15 on Triple J's Hottest 100 of 2004.

Track listing
 "Gamble Everything for Love"
 "Ache for You"
 "The Serious Mythology of the Yeah Yeah Yeahs" (non-album track)
 "Desire" (non-album track)
 "Hellbent for Heaven" (non-album track)

Personnel
Ben Lee
Lara Meyerratken
McGowan Southworth – guitar

Special guests
Jason Schwartzman
Har Mar Superstar
Jenny Lewis
Jason Falkner

Charts

References

2004 singles
Ben Lee songs
2004 songs